São Domingos do Sul is a municipality in the Brazilian state of Rio Grande do Sul. It is situated at a latitude of 28º31'51 South and a longitude of 51º53'16" West. As of 2020, it has an estimated population of 3,083 inhabitants on an area of 78.67 km². Its current mayor is Domingos Scartazzini.

References

É nesta cidade que existe a Banda Cerbaro, uma banda centenária composta por instrumentos de sopro.

Municipalities in Rio Grande do Sul